Harvest Train is an independent EP by Juno Award winning Canadian singer-songwriter Melanie Doane.

Track listing
"She's Like the Swallow"
"Harvest Train"
"I Pray"
"Once He Was Mine"
"Sweet 16"
"The Zoo Is Closed"

1993 EPs
Melanie Doane albums